Sibunag, officially the Municipality of Sibunag, is a 4th class municipality in the province of Guimaras, Philippines. According to the 2020 census, it has a population of 23,162 people.

Its territory includes the islands of Inampulugan, Natugna, and several other minor islets in the Guimaras Strait.

The town was created by virtue of Republic Act No. 7896 on February 20, 1995.

Sibunag is a part of the Metro Iloilo–Guimaras area, centered on Iloilo City.

Geography

Barangays
Sibunag is politically subdivided into 14 barangays.

 Alegria
 Ayangan
 Bubog
 Concordia
 Dasal (Poblacion)
 Inampulugan
 Maabay
 Millan
 Oracon
 Ravina
 Sabang
 San Isidro
 Sebaste
 Tanglad

Climate

Demographics

Economy

References

External links

Official webpage of the Province of Guimaras: Sibunag
 [ Philippine Standard Geographic Code]
Philippine Census Information

Municipalities of Guimaras